was a Japanese composer, lyricist, and singer from Nishi-ku, Sakai, Osaka, Japan. She participated in the opening and ending theme songs of the TV anime "Gu-Gu Gummo" under the name of "Susie Matsubara."

Her 1979 debut song "Mayonaka no Door" became a hit, reaching number 28 on the Oricon chart, selling 104,000 copies according to Oricon survey, and selling 300,000 copies announced by Canyon Records. In addition, since around 2020, the song has become widely heard not only in Japan but also overseas.

Early life
Matsubara was born November 28, 1959 in Kishiwada, Osaka in Japan. She spent her childhood in Hiraoka Town, Nishi-ku, Sakai, Osaka.

She grew up in a family of four, including a father, a mother and a younger sister. Her father was a board member of a hospital and her mother was a jazz singer who had sung with the Japanese jazz band and comedy group Crazy Cats. Matsubara started learning the piano at the age of three and later became familiar with jazz. As a child, she went to Sakai city's Hiraoka Elementary School and then in 1972, entered Poole Gakuin Junior High School. Around this time Matsubara became interested in rock music and joined the rock band "Kurei". In 1975 she started in Poole Gakuin High School and became active as a keyboard player of the band "Yoshinoya Band". They would play songs at a live house called Takutaku located in Kyoto. Matsubara was described as an excellent student and was expected by many around her to attend college, but at that time she had already made plans to pursue her dream of becoming a singer. In 1977, when she was still in high school, Matsubara went to Tokyo alone at the age of 17 to make her debut as a singer. The Japanese pianist  found her playing music and singing in various places in Kantō such as in the live music venue Birdland located in Roppongi, Tokyo.

Career 
Matsubara started her career in 1979 and is known from hit songs such as her debut and immediate breakthrough "Mayonaka no Door (Stay with Me)" which has been covered by numerous artists, including Akina Nakamori. The song was ranked 28th on the Oricon Chart, and according to that chart sold 104,000 copies and 300,000 copies announced by Canyon records. Some of her other known songs were "" and "The Winner" among others.

After the release of the song "Neat na gogo san-ji" Matsubara became a well-known singer during that time. She was offered by many to perform in college festivals, concerts and so on. The song even gained a feature in a commercial of the famous Japanese multinational personal care company Shiseido, only less than two years after her debut.

Miki Matsubara received a number of artist awards. Amidst her career, she formed her own band called Dr. Woo. Matsubara also had some international work with Motown jazz fusion group Dr. Strut in Los Angeles (becoming a backing band in the album recordings for "Cupid" and "Myself"), Tokyo and Osaka (Hall concerts), later releasing a jazz cover album entitled "BLUE EYES". In that album she covered some famous jazz songs like "Love for sale", she also covered the soft rock song "You've Got A Friend" originally written and sung by Carole King.

Her vocal range was that of a mezzo-soprano.

During her music career she released 8 singles, and 12 albums. Despite her work being mainly domestic, outside of Japan she was also known for her work as an anime singer and songwriter, singing the opening and ending songs to anime such as Dirty Pair: Project Eden, although recently with the popularization of city pop her other work has gained overseas fans as well. While singing theme songs for the anime Gu Gu Ganmo, she performed under the name Suzie Matsubara (スージー・松原). Matsubara's song "THE WINNER" was used as the opening for the Gundam OVA-series Mobile Suit Gundam 0083: Stardust Memory.

From the 1990s forwards she especially worked on anime soundtracks and music for commercials. Matsubara composed songs for a couple of anime, some of her most known musical compositions were for the anime series Gundam. Matsubara composed songs for several singers, like Hitomi Mieno, but her most notable works were likely with the singer and actress Mariko Kouda, whom Matsubara composed multiple songs to. Kouda's song "Ame no chi special (雨のちスペシャル)", which Matsubara composed, was featured in the five-minute music television and radio series Minna no Uta as a music video in 1997. It attracted a lot of attention and ranked 28th place in the Oricon chart. The song was repeatedly rebroadcast until 2004.

Personal life
Little is known about Miki Matsubara's personal life. She married Masaki Honjo (1953-2007), a backing band drummer for her band. Honjo later became a dentist and died in 2007 at the age of 54.

During Matsubara's years as a student, her eyesight deteriorated due to fatigue from a part-time job. Her eyesight was, however, fixed with surgery.

Illness and death 
At the end of 2000, Matsubara sent an email to those around her, including her company and the members of Dr. Woo, stating that she could not continue her music career and that she would not be reachable after the message went out. She stopped all music activities and disappeared from the spotlight altogether. In 2001, it was revealed that Matsubara's actions were prompted by a late-stage cancer diagnosis she had received at the time, after which she subsequently began treatment. Matsubara spent her final years battling her illness.

After being told by her doctor that she only had three months left to live, Matsubara died on October 7, 2004, at age 44 due to complications from uterine cervix cancer. Her death was announced to the public two months later.

Legacy 
An increased interest in city pop during the 21st century, particularly the 2010s, contributed to Matsubara gaining global recognition and "Stay with Me" (真夜中のドア, "Mayonaka no door") becoming a resurgent hit in the West and throughout Asia in 2020. Billboard Japan credits Indonesian YouTuber Rainych for the song's initial surge in popularity, after she shared a cover version with her almost 1.3 million subscribers on the platform in October that year. This rediscovery of the song in Indonesia—indicated by an upsurge of streams on digital music platforms Apple Music and Spotify—then spread to other countries worldwide and it continued to gain traction, especially in North America where it became a "'visible hit' on numerous streaming rankings" and "shot to No. 1 on Spotify's viral charts". The song became a well-known sound on the multimedia streaming app TikTok, most notably during December 2020—prior to this, it was already somewhat popular in the platform's anime community—where it sparked a trend among users of Japanese descent, who shared videos of themselves playing the song for their mothers and filming their reactions when they recognized the track. One such video garnered over 23 million views and 6 million likes. As of February 2021, the sound has been used in over 200,000 videos on the platform.

As a result of this resurgence in popularity, Matsubara's debut album, Pocket Park, was repressed on vinyl in late 2020.

Discography

Studio albums

Compilations

Singles

Some notable compositions

See also
Gu Gu Ganmo
Victor Entertainment
Dirty Pair: Project Eden
Mobile Suit Gundam 0083: Stardust Memory
Ojamajo Doremi
Ojamajo Doremi discography
Mariko Kouda
Mayumi Gojo
J-pop

References

External links
 
 
 Miki Matsubara at VGMdb
 Miki Matsubara at Last.fm

1959 births
2004 deaths
20th-century Japanese composers
20th-century Japanese women singers
20th-century Japanese singers
Deaths from cancer in Japan
Deaths from uterine cancer
Japanese women composers
Musicians from Osaka
People from Sakai, Osaka
20th-century women composers
Anime composers